KJDY may refer to:

 KJDY (AM), a radio station (1400 AM) licensed to John Day, Oregon, United States
 KJDY-FM, a radio station (94.5 FM) licensed to Canyon City, Oregon, United States